Willie Scott is the name of:

William Scott (actor) (1893–1967), American silent film actor
Willie Scott (American football) (1959–2021), American football player
Willie Scott (basketball) (born 1947), American professional basketball player
Willie Scott (Indiana Jones character), character in the 1984 film Indiana Jones and the Temple of Doom

See also
William Scott (disambiguation)